Drew William Wolitarsky (born March 22, 1995) is a professional Canadian football wide receiver for the Winnipeg Blue Bombers of the Canadian Football League (CFL). He is a two-time Grey Cup champion after winning with the Blue Bombers in 2019 and 2021.

College career
Wolitarksy played for the Minnesota Golden Gophers from 2013 to 2016. Over the course of his collegiate career, he played in 47 games where he recorded 130 receptions for 1,749 yards and nine touchdowns. In his final game as a college athlete, in the 2016 Holiday Bowl, Wolitarsky led his team in receiving with five catches for 73 yards in the upset win over the Washington State Cougars.

Professional career
Following his time with the Golden Gophers, Wolitarsky was not selected in the 2017 NFL Draft and had an unsuccessful tryout with the Minnesota Vikings. His brother, Austin, encouraged him pursue a career in the Canadian Football League where he could qualify as a National player with a Canadian citizenship since his mother was from Montreal. He applied for his citizenship, got it approved in one day, and notified the Canadian Football League Players' Association who relayed the information to the league's teams. Since the 2017 CFL Draft had already passed, Wolitarsky was made eligible in a supplemental draft where he was selected by the Winnipeg Blue Bombers on June 27, 2017 who forfeited a third round selection in the 2018 CFL Draft for his playing rights. He signed a practice roster agreement on July 11, 2017. Wolitarsky played in his first professional game on October 6, 2017 against the Hamilton Tiger-Cats where he had one catch for 15 yards. He played in five regular season games in his rookie season and also dressed in the team's West Semi-Final loss to the Edmonton Eskimos.

Wolitarsky earned a starting position with the Blue Bombers following 2018 training camp and in his first career regular season start on June 14, 2021, against the Eskimos, he scored his first career touchdown on a 20-yard reception from his former college teammate, Chris Streveler. He had a career-high 10 receptions for 90 yards in an August 25, 2018, game against the Calgary Stampeders. He played and started in all 18 regular season games where he had 45 catches for 650 yards and five touchdowns. He also started in both post-season games where he totalled six receptions for 81 yards and one touchdown.

During his third season with the Blue Bombers, Wolitarsky played and started in 17 regular season games and had 33 catches for 361 yards and four touchdowns. He also played in both playoff games, recording five catches for 78 yards, leading to Wolitarsky playing in his first Grey Cup championship game. In the 107th Grey Cup, he had three catches for 40 yards as the Blue Bombers defeated the Hamilton Tiger-Cats 33-12 and Wolitarsky won his first championship. After that season, he signed a two-year extension to remain in Winnipeg through the 2021 season. However, he did not play in 2020 due to the cancellation of the 2020 CFL season.

Statistics

Personal life
Wolitarksy was born in Santa Clarita, California, to John and Audrey Wolitarsky. His mother was originally from Montreal where she met his father, who was from the United States but living in Montreal. Due to his mother's Canadian citizenship, Wolitarsky pursued his own citizenship for Canada and received it in time to be able to play in the 2017 CFL season. Wolitarsky is also a musician and released his first EP on January 29, 2021.

References

External links

Winnipeg Blue Bombers profile
Minnesota Golden Gophers profile

1993 births
Living people
Winnipeg Blue Bombers players
Canadian football wide receivers
American football wide receivers
Players of American football from California
Minnesota Golden Gophers football players
American players of Canadian football
Sportspeople from Santa Clarita, California
American sportspeople of Canadian descent